The Albert and Mary Shekey House is located in Koshkonong, Wisconsin. It was added to the State Register of Historic Places in 2014 and to the National Register of Historic Places the following year.

References

Houses on the National Register of Historic Places in Wisconsin
National Register of Historic Places in Jefferson County, Wisconsin
Houses in Jefferson County, Wisconsin
Queen Anne architecture in Wisconsin
Houses completed in 1885